David Miller (March 17, 1883, Ohio River, OhioNovember 1, 1953) was an American country musician. He is one of the earliest musicians to be associated with country music recording.

Miller grew up working at a fruit farm, and served in the Army in World War I. While there, he contracted blepharitis, and became totally blind as a result. After his blindness set in, he began playing guitar and moved to Huntington, West Virginia. He recorded a few pieces for the Starr Piano Company in 1924 and again in 1927, which are some of the earliest surviving audio documents of old-time music. He also recorded for Paramount Records in 1930. He played on West Virginia radio station WSAZ with Cecil Adkins from 1927 to 1933. He also played with a string band called the West Virginia Mockingbirds in the 1930s and 1940s, alongside four brothers, Ed, George, Albert, and Frank Baumgardner. They played on radio  and at local churches and dance parties, and became regionally popular. Miller continued to perform into the early 1950s, playing regularly at the Guyandotte theater alongside musicians such as T. Texas Tyler and Patsy Cline.

References 

[ David Miller] at Allmusic

1883 births
1953 deaths
American country singer-songwriters
Blind musicians
Gennett Records artists
Country musicians from West Virginia
Singer-songwriters from Ohio
20th-century American singers
Country musicians from Ohio
Singer-songwriters from West Virginia